Mahurangi Island, also known as Goat Island, is located  to the north-east of Hahei on the Coromandel Peninsula in New Zealand's North Island. The uninhabited island is 6 hectares in size.

Mahurangi Island forms one corner of the Te Whanganui-A-Hei (Cathedral Cove) Marine Reserve.

Nearby are many smaller islands including Okorotere and Te Tio Islands.

See also

 Motueka Island (Pigeon Island)
 New Zealand outlying islands
 List of islands of New Zealand
 List of islands
 Desert island

References

External links

Thames-Coromandel District
Islands of Waikato
Uninhabited islands of New Zealand